2023 Emmy Awards may refer to:

 50th Daytime Emmy Awards, scheduled for June 16, 2023, honoring daytime programming.
 75th Primetime Emmy Awards, scheduled for September 18, 2023, honoring primetime programming.

Emmy Award ceremonies by year